Bogon filtering is the practice of filtering bogons, which are bogus (fake) IP addresses of a computer network. Bogons include IP packets on the public Internet that contain addresses that are not in any range allocated or delegated by the Internet Assigned Numbers Authority (IANA) or a delegated regional Internet registry (RIR) and allowed for public Internet use. The areas of unallocated address space are called the bogon space.

Bogons also include some address ranges from allocated space, also known as Martian packets, mainly when they are being used as source address. Also addresses for Carrier-grade NAT, Teredo, and 6to4 and documentation prefixes fall into this category.

Many ISPs and end-user firewalls filter and block bogons, because they have no legitimate use, and usually are the result of accidental misconfiguration or malicious intent. Bogons can be filtered by using router access-control lists (ACLs), or by BGP blackholing.

IP addresses that are currently in the bogon space may not be bogons at a later date because IANA and other registries frequently assign new address space to ISPs. Announcements of new assignments are often published on network operators' mailing lists (such as NANOG) to ensure that operators have a chance to remove bogon filtering for addresses that have become legitimate. , the Internet Engineering Task Force (IETF) recommends that, since there are no longer any unallocated IPv4 s, IPv4 bogon filters based on registration status should be removed.
However, bogon filters still need to check for Martian packets.

Etymology
The term bogon stems from hacker jargon, with the earliest appearance in the Jargon File in version 1.5.0 (dated 1983).  It is defined as the quantum of bogosity, or the property of being bogus. A bogon packet is frequently bogus both in the conventional sense of being forged for illegitimate purposes, and in the hackish sense of being incorrect, absurd, and useless.

These unused IP addresses are collectively known as a bogon, a contraction of "bogus logon", or a logon from a place you know no one can actually logon.

See also
 Reverse-path forwarding
 IP hijacking
 IP address spoofing
 Ingress filtering
 Internet background noise

References

External links
 Bogons Ate My Website
 Bogon traffic analysis report, netflow and spam analysis  
 RIPE NCC: De-Bogonising New Address Blocks
 Team Cymru Bogon Reference

Computer jargon
Internet Protocol